Genzano di Lucania is a town and comune in the province of Potenza, Basilicata, southern Italy.

References

External links
 Google Map of Genzano di Lucania

Cities and towns in Basilicata